This list of the University of Notre Dame alumni, includes graduates, non-graduate former students, and current students of Notre Dame and its graduate and professional schools. Since the university's founding in 1842, there have been 162 commencement exercises at the university. Although only two degrees were awarded to the first class in 1849, today the living alumni, known collectively as the "Fighting Irish", number near 120,000.

Academia and research

Educators

Nobel Laureates

Professors, scientists, inventors and researchers

name

Art and architecture

Business

Entertainment

Government and law

Members of the United States Congress

United States governors

Ambassadors from the United States

{{Alum
|name= Jerome G. Cooper
|year= 1958
|nota= Former ambassador to Jamaica
|ref=

Foreign political figures

Other U.S. political and legal figures

Journalists and media personalities

Military

NASA crew members

Religion

{{Alum
|name= Timothy Galvin
|  year = 1916
| nota = Deputy Supreme Knight of the Knights of Columbus, president of the Notre Dame Alumni Association
| ref =

Sports

Although Notre Dame is highly ranked academically, it is also strong in athletics, producing a large number of athletes. Over 400 students have gone on to play professional American football in the National Football League, American Football League, or the All-America Football Conference, including recent graduates, like Brady Quinn and Pro Football Hall of Famers like Joe Montana. Additionally, Notre Dame had had 47 former students inducted into the College Football Hall of Fame, including football pioneer Knute Rockne. In addition to football, Notre Dame has had a number of athletes go professional, such as Women's National Basketball Association star Skylar Diggins-Smith and National Baseball Hall of Famer Carl Yastrzemski. Notre Dame has also produced a number of Olympians, including fencing medalists Mariel Zagunis and Nick Itkin.

Coaches and executives

Other

Fictional

 Thomas Schuler

References

 Notable Alumni University of Notre Dame. Retrieved on 2008-01-31.

External links
 University of Notre Dame official website
 University of Notre Dame Alumni Association

University of Notre Dame alumni

Alumni